Real Noroeste Capixaba Futebol Clube, commonly known as Real Noroeste, is a Brazilian football club based in Águia Branca, Espírito Santo state. They competed in the Copa do Brasil once.

Real Noroeste is currently ranked fifth among Espírito Santo teams in CBF's national club ranking, at 170th place overall.

History
The club was founded on 9 April 2008. They finished as runners-up in the Copa Espírito Santo in 2010, when they were defeated in the final by Vitória. Real Noroeste competed in the Campeonato Capixaba Second Level in 2011. The club won the Copa Espírito Santo in 2011, after they beat Águia Branca in the final, and in 2013, after they defeated Cachoeiro in the final. The club was eliminated in the First Stage of the 2012 Copa do Brasil by Ipatinga.

Honours
 Campeonato Capixaba
 Winners (2): 2021, 2022

 Copa Espírito Santo
 Winners (4): 2011, 2013, 2014, 2019

Stadium
Real Noroeste Capixaba Futebol Clube play their home games at Estádio José Olímpio da Rocha. The stadium has a maximum capacity of 3,200 people.

References

Association football clubs established in 2008
Football clubs in Espírito Santo
2008 establishments in Brazil